Maalbeek, stream
Maelbeek/Maalbeek metro station, a subway station